Dente Teladas is a district located in the Tulang Bawang Regency of Lampung in Sumatra, Indonesia.

Border 
The border district of Dente Teladas as follows:

References 

Sumatra
Lampung